The Partizani Complex is the training ground and academy base of Albanian football club, Partizani Tirana.

Development
On 9 March 2016, the Albanian government agreed to a 99-year, €1 lease of the 37,000m2 Military Base 4030, located on Myslym Keta Road on the outskirts of Tiranë known as Tufine, which is where Partizani will build their new training complex as well as their proposed 4,500 seater stadium.

References

FK Partizani Tirana
Association football training grounds in Albania
Sports venues in Tirana